Pei Mama is a 2021 Tamil-language horror comedy film directed by Sakthi Chidambaram and starring Yogi Babu. Produced by Bakiya Cinemass, it was released on 24 September 2021.

Cast

Production 
In March 2019, Sakthi Chidambaram announced plans of making a film titled Pei Mama starring Vadivelu in the lead role. The actor later opted out of the project citing creative differences.

Sakthi Chidambaram became interested in casting Yogi Babu after media reports had suggested that the actor was set to replace Vadivelu in the shelved sequel to Imsai Arasan 23rd Pulikecei (2006). Despite initially being reluctant, the actor agreed to join the film and completed shooting for the film by November 2019. Comedy actor Krishnamoorthy suffered a heart attack and died during the making of the film in Kumily.

In October 2020, the team held a function to release the audio soundtrack of the film. The event garnered attention as guests failed to adhere to the city's social distancing guidelines. As the film began promotions in September 2021, the film garnered criticism for morphing posters of the Hindi film Bhoot – Part One: The Haunted Ship (2020) to use for its own promotions.

Soundtrack 
Soundtrack was composed by Raj Aryan collaborating with Yogi Babu for second time after Gurkha.
Maattikittaan – Deva
Enna Vechu – Senthil Ganesh, Rajalakshmi
Vetta Vetta – Priya Subramaniam
Pei ottum – Raj Aryan
Engeyo Piranthen – Varun, Ramya

Release 
The film was released on 24 September 2021 across Tamil Nadu. A critic from Times of India wrote "things turn rather uninspiring in the latter half with a very clichéd flashback and a generic climax". Tamil newspapers Maalai Malar and Vikatan gave the film negative reviews.

Within two weeks after its release, the film had its television premiere on Kalaignar TV on 14 October 2021 on the eve of Vijayadasami.

References

External links 
 

2020s Tamil-language films
2021 comedy horror films
2021 films
Indian comedy horror films
Films directed by Sakthi Chidambaram